Amos Neheysi is a former Israeli footballer.

References

External links
 

1979 births
Living people
Israeli footballers
Maccabi Netanya F.C. players
Hakoah Maccabi Amidar Ramat Gan F.C. players
Maccabi Kafr Kanna F.C. players
Liga Leumit players
Israeli Premier League players
Footballers from Netanya
Association football midfielders